Valfin-sur-Valouse is a former commune in the Jura department in the Bourgogne-Franche-Comté region in eastern France. On 1 January 2018, it was merged into the new commune of Vosbles-Valfin.

Population

See also 
 Communes of the Jura department

References 

Former communes of Jura (department)